Cephalophyllum compressum is a species of plant in the family Aizoaceae. It is endemic to Namibia.  Its natural habitats are dry savanna and subtropical or tropical dry shrubland. It is threatened by habitat loss.

References

Flora of Namibia
compressum
Least concern plants
Taxonomy articles created by Polbot
Taxa named by Louisa Bolus